The "Virgin Islands March" is the regional anthem of the United States Virgin Islands. The song was composed by Sam Williams and U.S. Virgin Island native Alton Adams in the 1920s. It served as an unofficial regional anthem of the U.S. Virgin Islands until 1963, when it was officially recognized by Legislative Act.

The song itself is a brisk martial march, consisting of an introductory instrumental section followed by a very cheerful melody. The Guardian reporter Alex Marshall compared it favorably to some national anthems, suggesting that it was reminiscent of the music of the Disney film Mary Poppins.

Since the U.S. Virgin Islands is a U.S. insular territory, the national anthem is still the U.S. one, "The Star-Spangled Banner". During international sporting events, only the "Virgin Islands March" is played.

Lyrics
On most occasions, the first verse followed by the last verse is sung.

References

External links
MIDI version

North American anthems
Anthems of insular areas of the United States
United States Virgin Islands culture
1920s songs
National anthems